The Lakeside Cemetery Chapel is a historic chapel in Lakeside Cemetery, on North Avenue in Wakefield, Massachusetts.  The stone chapel, built 1913, is one of a few Neo-Gothic buildings in the town.  Roughly resembling English country churches, the building has a steeply pitched slate roof, with sidewalls containing supporting buttresses.  The front and rear of the chapel both have projecting entry sections that repeat the sharply pitched gable.

The chapel was listed on the National Register of Historic Places in 1989.

See also
 National Register of Historic Places listings in Wakefield, Massachusetts
 National Register of Historic Places listings in Middlesex County, Massachusetts

References

External links
 
 Lakeside Cemetery website

Cemeteries on the National Register of Historic Places in Massachusetts
Buildings and structures in Wakefield, Massachusetts
Cemeteries in Middlesex County, Massachusetts
Churches in Middlesex County, Massachusetts
National Register of Historic Places in Wakefield, Massachusetts